The Montenegrin records in swimming are the fastest ever performances of swimmers from Montenegro, which are recognised and ratified by the Water Polo and Swimming Federation of Montenegro.

All records were set in finals unless noted otherwise.

Long Course (50 m)

Men

Women

Short Course (25 m)

Men

Women

References

External links
 Montenegrin Long Course Records – Men
 Montenegrin Long Course Records – Women
 Montenegrin Short Course Records – Men
 Montenegrin Short Course Records – Women

Montenegro
Records
Swimming